Paul Herrmann (born November 16, 1985 in Dresden) is a German short-track speed-skater.

Herrmann competed at the 2010 Winter Olympics for Germany. In the 1000 metres he placed third in his opening heat, and in the 1500 metres, he placed sixth in the opening round, both timesfailing to advance. As a member of the German 5000 metre relay team, he finished 3rd in the semifinal and 2nd in the B Final, ending up 5th overall. His best individual performance was in the 1000 metres, where he finished 22nd overall.

As of 2013, Herrmann's best performance at the World Championships came in 2011, when he won a silver medal as a member of the German 5000m relay team. His best individual performance at a World Championships was also in 2011, placing 12th in the 500 metres. He also won a gold medal as a member of the German relay team at the 2007 European Championships.

As of 2013, Herrmann has one ISU Short Track Speed Skating World Cup victory, one as part of the relay team in 2010-2011 at Dresden, and four other podium finishes, also all in relay races. His top World Cup ranking is 11th, in the 1500 metres in 2006–07.

World Cup Podiums

References 

1985 births
Living people
German male short track speed skaters
Olympic short track speed skaters of Germany
Short track speed skaters at the 2010 Winter Olympics
World Short Track Speed Skating Championships medalists
Sportspeople from Dresden